Ahmed Mohammed Sharahili (born May 8, 1994) is a Saudi professional footballer who plays for Al-Ittihad as a defender.

Career statistics

Club

International
Statistics accurate as of match played 29 March 2022.

Honours
Al-Hilal
Saudi Professional League: 2016–17
King Cup: 2015, 2017
Crown Prince Cup: 2015–16
Saudi Super Cup: 2015, 2018

Al-Ittihad
Saudi Super Cup: 2022

External links

References

1993 births
Living people
Sportspeople from Riyadh
Association football defenders
Saudi Arabian footballers
Al Hilal SFC players
Al-Fateh SC players
Al-Shabab FC (Riyadh) players
Ittihad FC players
Saudi Arabia youth international footballers
Saudi Arabia international footballers
Saudi Professional League players